Kaduna Museum is a museum in Kaduna, Nigeria. The museum was opened in 1975 following the donation of the old Northern People's Congress (NPC) building by the North Central State Government. The Kaduna Museum contains a substantial collection of archaeological, ethnolographic and crafts exhibits and has a live crafts centre in which traditional craftsmen and women can be observed making crafts.

References

Museums in Nigeria
Museums established in 1975
Kaduna
1975 establishments in Nigeria
20th-century architecture in Nigeria